The 2015 Men's African Volleyball Championship was played in Cairo, Egypt, from July 20 to 31, 2015. The top two teams qualified for the 2015 FIVB Volleyball Men's World Cup.

Competing nations
The following national teams have confirmed participation:

Squads

Venues

Format
The competition system of the 2015 Men's African Championship is the single Round-Robin system. Each team plays once against each of the 4 remaining teams. Points are accumulated during the whole tournament, and the final ranking is determined by the total points gained.

Pool standing procedure
 Number of matches won
 Match points
 Sets ratio
 Points ratio
 Result of the last match between the tied teams

Match won 3–0 or 3–1: 3 match points for the winner, 0 match points for the loser
Match won 3–2: 2 match points for the winner, 1 match point for the loser

Preliminary round

Pool A

|}

|}

Pool B

|}

|}

Final round

5–8th place

Classification 5–8 places

|}

Seventh place match

|}

Fifth place match

|}

Championship

Semifinals

|}

Bronze medal match

|}

Final

|}

Final standing

Awards

MVP:
  Ahmed Abdelhay
Best Receiver:
  Mohamed Abdel Moneim
Best Spiker:
  Mohamed Al Hachdadi
Best Blocker:
  Mohamed Adel

Best Server:
  Abelhalim Abou
Best Setter:
  Amir Kerboua
Best Libero:
  Tayeb Korbosli

See also
2015 Women's African Volleyball Championship

References

https://web.archive.org/web/20150905115352/http://www.cavb.org/pagescom.php?option=pagedetail&id=462

External links

2015 men
African men's Volleyball Championship
men's African Volleyball Championship
Men's African Volleyball Championship
International volleyball competitions hosted by Egypt
Men's African Volleyball Championship